Erving Dzho Botaka-Ioboma (born 5 October 1998) is a Russian footballer who plays as a centre-back for Ufa.

Club career
He made his debut in the Russian Professional Football League for FC Solyaris Moscow on 20 July 2016 in a game against FSK Dolgoprudny.

In July 2018 his failed transfer back to Torpedo Moscow caused a stir when it was reported the club canceled his contract because the ultras refused to allow a black footballer to play for the club. Torpedo later denied this via an official statement but the Torpedo ultras were adamant with their own statement.

He made his Russian Football National League debut for Luch Vladivostok on 24 July 2019 in a game against FC Neftekhimik Nizhnekamsk.

On 11 June 2021, he signed a long-term contract with Russian Premier League club Ufa, reuniting with his former Veles coach Aleksei Stukalov. He made his RPL debut for Ufa on 18 September 2021 in a game against FC Khimki.

Career statistics

References

External links
 
 
 

1998 births
People from Pushkino
Sportspeople from Moscow Oblast
Russian people of Republic of the Congo descent
Living people
Russian footballers
Russia youth international footballers
Association football defenders
FC Solyaris Moscow players
FC Samgurali Tskaltubo players
FC Veles Moscow players
FC Luch Vladivostok players
FC Ufa players
Russian Premier League players
Russian First League players
Russian Second League players
Erovnuli Liga 2 players
Russian expatriate footballers
Expatriate footballers in Georgia (country)
Russian expatriate sportspeople in Georgia (country)